State Highway 147 (SH 147) is a state highway that runs from Zavalla north near to Shelbyville in Deep East Texas. The route was designated on March 19, 1930 as a renumbering of SH 8B from San Augustine to Zavalla. On March 26, 1942, SH 147 was cancelled and redesignated as FM 10. On September 9, 1947, FM 10 was cancelled and redesignated as SH 147, its original designation. SH 147 was extended north along the old route of U.S. Highway 96 from San Augustine to southeast of Shelbyville on August 20, 1952. On July 31, 1984, SH 147 was rerouted to be concurrent with new SH 21 rather than old SH 21.

Junction list

References

147
Transportation in Angelina County, Texas
Transportation in San Augustine County, Texas
Transportation in Shelby County, Texas